The Sangatta Coal Mine is a coal mine located in East Kalimantan. The mine has coal reserves amounting to 3.6 billion tonnes of coking coal, one of the largest coal reserves in Asia and the world. The mine has an annual production capacity of 35.7 million tonnes of coal.

See also 
 Bengalon coal mine - part of the same mine complex (KPC Operation)

References 

Coal mines in Indonesia